Flinders Ranges Council is a local government area (LGA) located in the Flinders Ranges of South Australia.

The LGA is approximately 100 km from north to south, and 45 km from east to west, with a total area of 4,198 square kilometres.

The main towns within the council are Hawker and Quorn; it also includes the localities of Barndioota, Kanyaka and Stephenston, and part of Bruce, Cradock, Flinders Ranges, Moockra, Saltia, Shaggy Ridge, Wilmington and Yarrah.

It was created on 1 January 1997 following the merger of the District Council of Kanyaka-Quorn and the District Council of Hawker.

The LGA adjoins the following to the south - City of Port Augusta, District Council of Mount Remarkable and District Council of Orroroo Carrieton, while the remainder of the adjoining land is within the unincorporated area of South Australia where municipal services are provided by the Outback Communities Authority.

Flinders Ranges Council is entirely in the state electorate of Giles and the federal Division of Grey.

Council

The Flinders Ranges Council has a directly elected mayor.

References

External links
Official site

Local government areas of South Australia
Flinders Ranges
Far North (South Australia)